Makbul Hossain Politician of Chuadanga District of Bangladesh and former member of Parliament for Chuadanga-1 constituency in 1986.

Career 
Makbul was elected a Member of Parliament from Chuadanga-1 constituency as an independent candidate in the third parliamentary elections of 1986.  After that he joined Jatiya Party.

References 

Living people
Year of birth missing (living people)
People from Chuadanga District
Jatiya Party (Ershad) politicians
3rd Jatiya Sangsad members